This is a list of airports in Brazil. 

The National Civil Aviation Agency of Brazil lists 491 public and 2,677 private aerodromes in Brazil on March 10, 2022. 



Airports

Airport names shown in bold indicate that the airport is served by scheduled services.

 
 Consortium formed by a partnership between Socicam Ltda and Dix Ltda
 Consortium formed by a partnership between Socicam Ltda and Sinart Ltda

Notable former airports

Defunct airports

Air Force and Navy Bases

See also
 List of airports by ICAO code: S#SB SD SI SJ SN SS SW - Brazil
 List of the busiest airports in Brazil
 Transport in Brazil

References

 Aeroportos Brasileiros - São Paulo Sem Segredos
 
  - includes IATA codes
 Great Circle Mapper: Airports in Brazil

 

Brazil
Brazil